Asalebria is a genus of snout moths. It was erected by Hans Georg Amsel in 1953 and is known from Spain and Russia.

Species
 Asalebria florella 
 Asalebria geminella 
 Asalebria imitatella 
 Asalebria pseudoflorella 
 Asalebria venustella

References

Phycitini
Pyralidae genera
Taxa named by Hans Georg Amsel